John Horner may refer to:

 John Henry Horner, also known as Cactus Jack (1927–2004), Canadian rancher, politician, and former cabinet minister
 John M. Horner (1821–1907), founder of Union City, California
 John S. Horner (1802–1883), American politician
 Sir John Francis Fortescue Horner (1842–1927), British barrister
 John Horner (British politician) (1911–1997), British firefighter, trade unionist and politician
 John Horner (organist) (1899–1973), organist, choirmaster and music teacher in South Australia
 John Horner (police officer), American chief of police of Los Angeles in 1885
 John R. Horner (born 1946), American paleontologist
 John Horner (Rector of Lincoln College, Oxford) (1792–?), Oxford college head
 John Horner, a fictional character in The Adventure of the Blue Carbuncle, a Sherlock Holmes story by Sir Arthur Conan Doyle

See also
 Jack Horner (disambiguation)
 Horner (disambiguation)